Pigi County is a county in Jonglei, South Sudan.

References

Counties of South Sudan
Jonglei State